The 2021–22 Federation Cup (due to sponsorship from Bashundhara Group also known as Bashundhara Group Federation Cup 2021) was the 33rd edition of the tournament, the main domestic annual top-tier clubs football competition in Bangladesh organized by Bangladesh Football Federation (BFF). The 12 participants were competed in the tournament. The tournament was played from 25 December 2021 to 9 January 2022.The winner of the tournament will earn the slot of playing Qualifying play-off of 2023–24 AFC Cup.

Dhaka Abahani are current champions. The club have defeated Rahmatganj MFS by 2–1 on 9 January  2022 to lift the trophy for the twelfth time.

Venue
All matches was held at BSSS Mostafa Kamal Stadium in Dhaka, Bangladesh.

Participating teams
The following twelve teams will contest in the tournament.

Draw
The draw ceremony of the tournament were held on 23 December 2021 12:00 BST at 3rd floor of BFF house Motijheel, Dhaka, Bangladesh. The twelve participants were divided into four groups. Top two teams from each group will through into the Knockout stage.

Group summary

Round and dates

Match officials
Referees

 Bituraj Borua
 Md Alamgir Sarkar
 Bhubon Mohon Torafder
 Saymoon Hasan Sany
 Md Anisur Rahman
 Mohammad Jalaluddin

Assistant Referees
 Md Monir Dhali
 Md Rasel Mia
 Md Nuruzzaman
 Sujoy Borua
 Md Khorshed Islam
   Junayed Sharif
 Sheikh Iqbal Alam
 Md Mahmudul Hasan Mamun
 Sharifuzzaman Khan Tipu
 Md Shah Alam

Group stages

Tiebreakers
Teams were ranked according to points (3 points for a win, 1 point for a draw, 0 points for a loss), and if tied on points, the following tie-breaking criteria were applied, in the order given, to determine the rankings.
Points in head-to-head matches among tied teams;
Goal difference in head-to-head matches among tied teams;
Goals scored in head-to-head matches among tied teams;
If more than two teams are tied, and after applying all head-to-head criteria above, a subset of teams are still tied, all head-to-head criteria above are reapplied exclusively to this subset of teams;
Goal difference in all group matches;
Goals scored in all group matches;
Penalty shoot-out if only two teams were tied and they met in the last round of the group;
Disciplinary points (yellow card = 1 point, red card as a result of two yellow cards = 3 points, direct red card = 3 points, yellow card followed by direct red card = 4 points);
Drawing of lots.

Group A

Group B

Group C

Group D

Knockout stage
In the knockout stages, if a match finished goalless at the end of normal playing time, extra time would have been played (two periods of 15 minutes each) and followed, if necessary, by a penalty shoot-out to determine the winner.

Bracket

Quarter-finals

Semi-finals

Final

Winners

Statistics

Goalscorers

Own goals 
† Bold Club indicates winner of the match

References

External links

Bangladesh Federation Cup
2020 in Bangladeshi football
1
2020–21 Asian domestic association football cups